EB/Streymur is a Faroese semi-professional football club based in Streymnes and Eiði. The club was founded in 1993, as result of the merger between EB and Streymur. They have won the Faroe Islands Premier League twice and the Faroe Islands Cup four times.

History

The club is a result of a merger in 1993 between Eiðis Bóltfelag, who were founded on 24 February 1913, and Streymur, founded in 1976.
Prior to the merger, both EB Eiði and Streymur usually played their football in the second or third division. After the merger in 1993, the team still resided in the lower divisions, but this soon changed. With a newly built football ground at Mølin, Eiði, and a healthy injection of young talent, EB/Streymur chased promotion to the top flight. Among these players in were: Hans Pauli Samuelsen, Bárður Olsen (Haldórsvík), Brian Olsen (Tjørnuvík), Marni Djurhuus, Gert Hansen, Arnbjørn Hansen (Kollafjørður). With the help of veteran attacker Jón Sigurd Gleðisheygg, the team won promotion in the 1999/00 season, finishing in place second, behind B36.

EB/Streymur had since gained a foothold in the top division (Betri deildin), as a title contenders. In 2006, following a mid-table finish the previous season, the club made a strong start to the season under Polish coach Piotr Krakowski, and led the league at the mid-summer break, having recorded a club record 8–2 win against B68 Toftir. With four matches left to play their lead at the top of the table was seven points. A dip in form followed, but the club went into the final match requiring a draw against KÍ to win the title. However, a late KÍ goal, coupled with HB taking the lead in their match with two minutes remaining meant EB/Streymur were denied the title. In 2007, the club again finished second, and played in European competition for the first time, losing 2–1 on aggregate to Finnish club MyPa in the UEFA Cup first qualifying round.

Prior to the 2008 season, EB/Streymur had never won the Faroese championship neither before nor after the merger, however on 15 August 2007 and again on 14 June 2008, EB/Streymur won a trophy for the first time by winning the Faroe Islands Cup and its second by winning the Cup again as holders the year after. On 21 October 2008, after finishing as runners-up in the league two years in a row previously, the club finally won its first championship, and thus the double in the 2008 season.

In July 2008, the club was drawn against Manchester City of England's Premier League in the first qualifying round of the UEFA Cup 2008-09. Director Rólant Højsted announced that the home leg of the tie would be held at one of the larger grounds in the Faroe Islands, either Toftir or Tórshavn, as the club's við Margáir ground has a capacity of only 1,000. The tie, which was played in Tórshavn, ended with a defeat of 0 – 2 to Manchester City with goals coming in the first half from Martin Petrov & Dietmar Hamann. The away leg was played at the Oakwell Stadium of Championship League side Barnsley Football Club rather than Manchester City's, City of Manchester Stadium due to the pitch being resurfaced. The pitch was re-surfaced as a Bon Jovi Concert was a couple of weeks before the match.

In 2012 EB/Streymur won their second league title.

On 25 September 2014, EB/Streymur lost one of the clubs best football players, the 22-year-old Gunnar Zachariasen, who died in a tragic accident on board a Greenlandic fishing trawler which was in Tórshavn in order to sell its fish. The accident happened while unloading fish from the trawler, something went wrong and a lot of boxes with frozen fish fell on top of Gunnar Zachariasen who died instantly. According to Rúni Nolsøe, EB/Streymurs coach, Faroese football had lost a very good football player. He played 11 caps and scored 4 goals for the U21 Faroe Islands team. EB/Streymur was supposed to play against NSÍ Runavík the a few days later, but the match was cancelled because of the death of Gunnar Zachariasen.

In 2020 the club was by many predicted as relegation candidate, but finished 7th in the 10 team Premier League (Betri deildin), comfortably clear of relegation.

Current squad

Updated 12 April 2022

Staff
Management
Chairman: Fróði Reinert Petersen

Sports
Head Coach: Jákup Martin Joensen
Assistant Coach: Jákup á Borg
Assistant Coach: Arnar Dam
Reserve Coach: Jan Dam

Managers
 Hans Jákup Andreasen (1993)
 Páll Guðlaugsson (Jan 1994 – June 94)
 Bergur Magnussen (June 1994 – Dec 94)
 Harry Benjaminsen (1997)
 Jón Sólsker
 Bergur Magnussen (2001)
 Trygvi Mortensen (2002)
 Piotr Krakowski (2003–07)
 Sámal Erik Hentze (2007)
 Sigfríður Clementsen (1 Jan 2008 – 30 June 2009)
 Heðin Askham (1 Aug 2009 – 31 Dec 2012)
 Rúni Nolsøe (1 Jan 2013–2014)
 Eliesar Olsen (2015)
 Olgar Danielsen (2016)
 Heðin Askham (2017–2018)
 Jákup Martin Joensen (2019–)

Honours
Faroe Islands Premier League: 2
 2008, 2012
Faroese Cup: 4
 2007, 2008, 2010, 2011
Faroe Islands Super Cup: 3
 2011, 2012, 2013
1. deild: 2
 2000, 2016

European cup history

It is notable that in June 2008 the side did very well to contain English champions Manchester City to just a 2–0 win with their semi-professional side in front of a crowd of 5,000 against players such as Brazil & AC Milan winger Robinho and Galatasaray central midfielder Elano

European record

See also
List of football clubs in the Faroe Islands

References

External links
 Official website 
 Við Margáir Stadium – Nordic Stadiums

 
Association football clubs established in 1993
1993 establishments in the Faroe Islands